"Only You Know and I Know" is a song written and originally recorded by Dave Mason in 1970. It is a track from his LP, Alone Together.  The song was his first charting single, and it became a modest hit for him in the U.S. and Canada.

Delaney & Bonnie version
"Only You Know and I Know" was recorded by Delaney & Bonnie in 1971.  It reached the Top 20 in the U.S. and the Top 10 in Canada.  It was included on their album the following year, D&B Together.

Chart history

Weekly charts
Dave Mason

Delaney & Bonnie

Other cover versions

 "Only You Know and I Know" was covered by Rita Coolidge on her 1971 LP Nice Feelin'.  It was much later used as the B-side to her 1978 Top 40 hit "You".
 "Only You And I Know" was also covered by Kimm Hekker in 1976. The song has only been released on single and is the A-Side of "Hey Boy".

References

External links
 
 
 

1970 songs
1970 singles
1971 singles
Blue Thumb Records singles
Atco Records singles
Songs written by Dave Mason
Dave Mason songs
Delaney and Bonnie songs
Song recordings produced by Delaney Bramlett